Patterson Belknap Webb & Tyler LLP, founded in 1919, is a law firm headquartered in New York City.

Notable alumni
Former Attorney General of the United States and federal judge Michael B. Mukasey was a partner at the firm before his accession to the bench in 1988, and served many years as a judge, returning to the firm before being appointed Attorney General.
Former President of Georgia Mikheil Saakashvili was formerly an intern with the firm.
Another former law partner is the former Manhattan District Attorney Robert Morgenthau.
Robert P. Patterson, Jr. and Paul G. Gardephe, formerly and currently a federal judge on the United States District Court for the Southern District of New York, were formerly partners.
Former New York City Mayor Rudy Giuliani (1977 - 1981)
Richard Parsons, former Chairman of Citigroup and Time Warner
Allison Rutledge-Parisi, chief administrative officer for Kaplan, Inc. and former actress, who appeared in Whit Stillman's Metropolitan (1990).
Togo D. West, Jr., former United States Secretary of Veterans Affairs

Notable partners
Edward F. Cox, son-in-law of President Richard Nixon
Guy Otto Farmer, former chair of the National Labor Relations Board
Peter C. Harvey, former Attorney General of New Jersey
William F. Cavanaugh Jr., former Deputy Assistant Attorney General for Civil Matters in the Antitrust Division of the Department of Justice from 2009 to 2010.

References

External links
Patterson Belknap Webb & Tyler LLP Web Site

 
Law firms based in New York City
Law firms established in 1919